The Barrington leaf-toed gecko (Phyllodactylus barringtonensis) is a species of lizard in the family Phyllodactylidae. The species is endemic to Santa Fe Island in the Galapagos.

Etymology
The specific name, barringtonensis, refers to Barrington Island, which is an alternate name for Santa Fe Island.

Habitat

Description

Reproduction
P. barringtonensis is oviparous.

References

Further reading
Rösler H (2000). "Kommentierte Liste der rezent, subrezent und fossil bekkanten Geckotaxa (Reptilia: Gekkonomorpha)". Gekkota 2: 28–153. (Phyllodactylus barringtonensis, p. 103). (in German).
Torres-Carvajal O, Rodríguez-Guerra A, Chaves JA (2016). "Present diversity of Galápagos leaf-toed geckos (Phyllodactylidae: Phyllodactylus) stems from three independent colonization events". Molecular Phylogenetics and Evolution 103: 1–5.
Van Denburgh J (1912). "Expedition of the California Academy of Sciences to the Galapagos Islands 1905–1906. VI. The Geckos of the Galapagos Archipelago". Proceedings of the California Academy of Sciences, Fourth Series 1: 405–430. (Phyllodactylus barringtonensis, new species, pp. 418–420).

Phyllodactylus
Endemic reptiles of the Galápagos Islands
Reptiles of Ecuador
Reptiles described in 1912